Elections to Mole Valley Council were held on 4 May 2000. The whole council was up for election with boundary changes since the last election in 1999. The council stayed under no overall control.

Election result

References
2000 Mole Valley election result

2000
2000 English local elections
2000s in Surrey